William Brian Herd (193118 July 2016) was an Anglican bishop in Uganda.

Herd was born in Belfast in 1931; educated at Clifton Theological College and ordained in 1959. After a curacy in Wolverhampton he served in Uganda.  He was Archdeacon of Karamoja from 1970 to 1975; and its Bishop from his consecration on 11 January 1976.

He died on 18 July 2016.

References

Anglican bishops of Karamoja
20th-century Anglican bishops in Uganda
Alumni of Clifton Theological College
Clergy from Belfast
1931 births
2016 deaths